Ready to Go! is the third album released by melody. It is her second album (and third release) to be released in a CD Only version as well as a CD+DVD version (limited edition). All of the A-sides from her singles leading up to the album are included in the track list, but none of the B-sides are, making for a total of ten brand-new songs. "Glory of Love" is a cover of Peter Cetera's hit song of the same name. The title track was also used as a Subaru Forester CM song.

Track listing

CD

 Finding My Road (4:32)
 With You (4:42)
 Love Story (4:50)
 All for Love (4:16)
 Hope (3:47)
 Glory of Love (4:09)
 Ready to Go! (4:46)
 One Day (4:14)
 Lovin' U (4:32)
 Real Me (4:00)
 All I Do (4:26)
 Shine (4:03)
 Dangerous (3:30)

DVD (Limited Edition only)
Music Video
 Lovin' U
 Finding My Road
 Love Story
Live Video
 Believe Me
 Gift of Love

Melody (Japanese singer) albums
Toy's Factory albums